Narasimha Nagar is a neighbourhood of Visakhapatnam City, India. It borders the Simhachalam hill range and Akkayyapalem. It falls under the local administrative limits of the Greater Visakhapatnam Municipal Corporation.

References

Neighbourhoods in Visakhapatnam